The GiMA Best Background Score is given by Global Indian Music Academy as a part of its annual Global Indian Music Academy Awards to recognise the best background music in a Hindi film.

Superlatives

List of winners
 2010 Shankar–Ehsaan–Loy  – My Name Is Khan
 2011 Sandeep Shirodkar  – Dabangg
 Vishal–Shekhar – Tees Maar Khan
 Amit Trivedi – Udaan
 Sandeep Shirodkar – Once Upon A Time In Mumbaai
 Wayne Sharpe – Rajneeti
 2012 A. R. Rahman – Rockstar
 Clinton Cerejo – Kahaani
 Ram Sampath – Delhi Belly
 Shankar–Ehsaan–Loy, Tubby – Don 2
 Shankar–Ehsaan–Loy, Tubby for – Zindagi Na Milegi Dobara
 2013 – (no award given)
 2014 Shankar–Ehsaan–Loy – Bhaag Milkha Bhaag
 A. R. Rahman – Raanjhanaa
 Raju Singh – Aashiqui 2
 Monty Sharma, Tubby for – Goliyon Ki Raasleela Ram-Leela
 Pritam – Yeh Jawaani Hai Deewani
 2015 Vishal Bhardwaj – Haider
 A. R. Rahman – Highway
 Amit Trivedi – Queen
 Clinton Cerejo – Dedh Ishqiya
 Tubby–Parik – 2 States
 2016 Sanchit Balhara – Bajirao Mastani
 Sachin–Jigar – ABCD 2
 Sachin–Jigar – Badlapur
 Shankar–Ehsaan–Loy – Dil Dhadakne Do
 Anupam Roy– Piku
 A. R. Rahman- Tamasha

See also
 Bollywood
 Cinema of India

References

Global Indian Music Academy Awards